Kim Seung-kew (also Kim Seung-gyu; born July 20, 1944 in Gwangyang, Korea) is a South Korean politician, lawyer and jurist who had served as the Minister of Justice from July 2004 to July 2005, and became the Director of the National Intelligence Service on July 5, 2005.

Kim Seung-kew was born in Gwangyang city of South Jeolla Province of the Republic of Korea. He finished schooling at Suncheon city Mesan High School, and graduated from the Seoul National University, Law Department, BL.

Career 
1970 - 12th Korean Bar, 
1999 - Head of Public Prosecutors' Office at Suwon, 
2001 - 42nd Deputy Minister of Justice of Korea, 
2002 - Vice Chief Public Prosecutor of the Supreme Public Prosecutor's Office of Korea, 
2002 - Chief Public Prosecutor of the Pusan Higher Public Prosecutor's Office, 
2004 - 56th Minister of Justice of Korea, 
2005 - 27th Director of the National Intelligence Service of Korea. 
At the moment - LOGOS Law Firm.

See also
List of Koreans
Politics of South Korea
Government of South Korea

References

1944 births
Living people
People from South Jeolla Province
20th-century South Korean lawyers
Seoul National University School of Law alumni
Justice ministers of South Korea
Directors of the National Intelligence Service (South Korea)
South Korean prosecutors